Dearnley is a surname. Notable people with the surname include:

Ben Dearnley (born 1964), English sculptor
Christopher Dearnley (1930–2000), English organist
Zak Dearnley (born 1998), English football player